UFC on ESPN: Vera vs. Cruz (also known as UFC on ESPN 41) was a mixed martial arts event produced by the Ultimate Fighting Championship that took place on August 13, 2022, at Pechanga Arena in San Diego, California, United States.

Background
A bantamweight bout between Marlon Vera and former two-time UFC Bantamweight Champion (also former WEC Bantamweight Champion) Dominick Cruz headlined the event.

Viviane Araújo was expected to face Alexa Grasso in a women's flyweight bout. The pair was previously scheduled to meet at UFC 270, but Araújo was forced to pull out from the event due to injury. In turn, Grasso pulled out due to visa issues and the bout was scrapped.

A women's strawweight bout between Yazmin Jauregui and Istela Nunes was expected to take place at the event. However, Nunes withdrew due to injury and was replaced by Iasmin Lucindo.

Cynthia Calvillo and Nina Nunes were previously scheduled to meet in a women's flyweight bout at UFC on ESPN: dos Anjos vs. Fiziev. In turn, Nunes fell ill on the day of that event and the bout was postponed to this date.

A flyweight bout between Malcolm Gordon and Allan Nascimento was expected to take place at this event. However, Gordon pulled out in late July due to an undisclosed injury and the bout was scrapped.

A women's bantamweight bout featuring Aspen Ladd and 2004 Olympic silver medalist in wrestling and former UFC Women's Bantamweight Championship challenger Sara McMann was expected to take place at the event. They were supposed to fight at UFC on ESPN: Poirier vs. Hooker in June 2020, but Ladd was forced to withdraw from that event after tearing both her anterior cruciate ligament (ACL) and medial collateral ligament (MCL) in training. The pairing was once again scrapped as Ladd tested positive for COVID-19 this time. They were rescheduled for UFC Fight Night: Sandhagen vs. Song on September 17.

A bantamweight bout between Youssef Zalal and Cristian Quiñonez was expected to take the event. However, Quiñonez was pulled from the fight due to alleged visa issues which restricted his travel and was replaced by Da'Mon Blackshear.

A welterweight bout between Jason Witt and Josh Quinlan was expected to take place one week prior at UFC on ESPN: Santos vs. Hill, but it was moved to this event after Quinlan was pulled for an atypical drug finding: long-term metabolite (or M3 metabolite) of the steroid dehydrochloromethyltestosterone (DHCMT) in his urine sample. They met in a catchweight of 180 pounds.

Former KSW Women's Flyweight Champion Ariane Lipski and Priscila Cachoeira were previously scheduled to meet in a flyweight bout at UFC Fight Night: Błachowicz vs. Jacaré, but the fight was cancelled after Cachoeira was suspended due to use of a diuretic. They were then expected to meet at UFC on ESPN: Santos vs. Hill, but after Lipski missed weight and was not medically cleared, they were rescheduled for this event in a bantamweight bout.

Results

Bonus awards
The following fighters received $50,000 bonuses.
 Fight of the Night: Nate Landwehr vs. David Onama
 Performance of the Night: Marlon Vera and Tyson Nam

Reported payout 
The following is the reported payout to the fighters as reported to the California State Athletic Commission (CSAC). It is important to note the amounts do not include sponsor money, discretionary bonuses, viewership points or additional earnings. The total disclosed payout for the event was $1,708,000.

 Marlon Vera: $300,000 (includes $150,000 win bonus) def. Dominick Cruz: $175,000
 Nate Landwehr: $60,000 (includes $30,000 win bonus) def. David Onama: $24,000
 Yazmin Jauregui: $50,000 (includes $25,000 win bonus) def. Iasmin Lucindo: $12,000
 Azamat Murzakanov: $24,000 (includes $12,000 win bonus) def. Devin Clark: $75,000
 Priscila Cachoeira: $80,000 (includes $40,000 win bonus) def. Ariane Lipski: $40,000
 Gerald Meerschaert: $140,000 (includes $70,000 win bonus) def. Bruno Silva: $40,000
 Angela Hill: $190,000 (includes $95,000 win bonus) def. Lupita Godinez: $45,000
 Martin Buday: $24,000 (includes $12,000 win bonus) def. Łukasz Brzeski: $10,000
 Nina Nunes: $80,000 (includes $40,000 win bonus) def. Cynthia Calvillo: $70,000
 Gabriel Benítez: $100,000 (includes $50,000 win bonus) def. Charlie Ontiveros: $12,000
 Tyson Nam: $50,000 (includes $25,000 win bonus) def. Ode' Osbourne: $28,000
 Josh Quinlan: $20,000 (includes $10,000 win bonus) def. Jason Witt: $23,000
 Da'Mon Blackshear: $12,000 vs. Youssef Zalal: $24,000

See also 

 List of UFC events
 List of current UFC fighters
 2022 in UFC

References 

UFC on ESPN
2022 in mixed martial arts
Events in San Diego
Mixed martial arts in San Diego
Sports competitions in San Diego
August 2022 sports events in the United States
Mixed martial arts in California